Diviš (feminine Divišová) is a Czech and Slovak surname. It may refer to:
 Alén Diviš, Czech painter
 Ivan Diviš, Czech poet
 Jakub Diviš, Czech footballer
 Jaroslav Diviš, Czech footballer
 Lukáš Diviš, Slovak volleyball player
 Richard Diviš, Czech hockey player
 Petra Divišová, Czech footballer
 Václav Prokop Diviš, Czech inventor

See also 
 Divíšek, diminutive form of Diviš
 Divis (surname)

Czech-language surnames